A number of steamships were named Ulysses, including -

, 
, 14,652 GRT
, 19,585 tons displacement
, 10,780 GRT
, 2,666 GRT

See also
, for Royal Navy vessels
, for motor vessels named Ulysses
, for United States Navy vessels
 Ulysses (disambiguation) 

Ship names